

Heinrich Georg Nickel (5 December 1894 – 2 January 1979) was a German general in the Wehrmacht of Nazi Germany who commanded the 342nd Infantry Division. He was a recipient of the  Knight's Cross of the Iron Cross with Oak Leaves.

Awards and decorations
 Iron Cross (1914) 2nd Class (29 July 1916) 1st Class  (18 August 1918)
 Clasp to the Iron Cross (1939) 2nd Class (19 September 1939) & 1st Class (13 November 1939)
 German Cross in Gold on 29 March 1943 as Oberst in Grenadier-Regiment 502
 Knight's Cross of the Iron Cross with Oak Leaves
 Knight's Cross on 16 June 1940 as Oberst and commander of III./Infanterie-Regiment 26
 543rd Oak Leaves on 8 August 1944 as Generalleutnant and commander of 342. Infanterie-Division

References

Citations

Bibliography

 
 
 

1894 births
1979 deaths
Lieutenant generals of the German Army (Wehrmacht)
Recipients of the clasp to the Iron Cross, 1st class
Recipients of the Gold German Cross
Recipients of the Knight's Cross of the Iron Cross with Oak Leaves
German prisoners of war in World War II held by the United States
People from Wesel
People from the Rhine Province
German police officers
Military personnel from North Rhine-Westphalia